Nate Osborne is an Australian-American rugby union coach. Who is regarded as one of the best American rugby coaches. Although being born in Australia he considers himself as an American, when it comes to rugby. 
He last served as the head coach of the New Orleans Gold. Before moving to Old Glory DC both of Major League Rugby (MLR) in the United States. 
He was the first head coach to reach 50 caps in the (MLR). He has a record of 28-23-1 all time. 
He is a hall of fame player and coach for Metropolis RFC.

Professional rugby career

Playing career
While in his 20s, Osborne played as a fly-half with the Denver Barbarians in the Rugby Super League.

Coaching career
Osborne became the head coach of Metropolis RFC in 2011, and led the team to the quarterfinals in 2014.

Osborne joined the United States national rugby union team as an assistant coach in 2014. He continued with the U.S. national team through to the 2015 Rugby World Cup, where he was the Backs/Attack coach.

Osborne was announced as the coach of the MLR's New Orleans Gold in June 2017 in preparation for the team's inaugural 2018 season. Announced April 1, 2022, Osborne will be the interim head coach for Old Glory DC.

References

Living people
American rugby union coaches
American people of Australian descent
Rugby union fly-halves
Major League Rugby coaches
New Orleans Gold
Old Glory DC
1967 births